AV Idol,  released as Love & Seoul in Japan, is a 2012 erotic comedy film directed by Hideo Jojo. It is a co-production between Japan and South Korea.

Cast
Yui Tatsumi as Ryoko
Yeo Min-Jeong as Yuna

References

2010s sex comedy films
Japanese sex comedy films
South Korean sex comedy films
2012 comedy films
2012 films
2010s Japanese films
2010s South Korean films